Taiping is a town in Jixian County, Heilongjiang province, China. , it administers Yongfa Residential Community and the following 17 villages:
Taiping Village
Taixing Village
Taizeng Village
Taishan Village
Tai'an Village
Taihui Village
Taihe Village
Taizhong Village
Taiheng Village
Taihong Village
Taiyu Village
Tailin Village
Taiyan Village
Taiyang Village
Taili Village
Tairong Village
Taifa Village

References

Township-level divisions of Heilongjiang
Jixian County